Wise Ol' Man is an EP by the Fall, released on 19 February 2016 by Cherry Red Records. It features two new songs, "Wise Ol' Man" and "All Leave Cancelled", as well as alternate versions and remixes of songs from the band's 2015 album Sub-Lingual Tablet, and a rare live performance of "No Xmas for John Quays" (from the Fall's first album Live at the Witch Trials), recorded at Brudenell Social Club in Leeds on 28 November 2014.

Track listing

Personnel
The Fall
 Mark E. Smith – vocals, production
 Elena Poulou – keyboards, vocals
 Peter Greenway – guitar
 Dave Spurr – bass 
 Keiron Melling – drums
 Daren Garratt – drums, backing vocals (uncredited)
Additional personnel
 Simon "Ding" Archer – engineering
 Andy Pearce – mastering
 Suzanne Smith – artwork

Notes

References

2016 EPs
The Fall (band) EPs